Manny Bermudez (born July 19, 1994) is an American mixed martial artist who competed in the bantamweight and featherweight divisions. A professional mixed martial artist since 2015, Bermudez has also competed in the Ultimate Fighting Championship.

Background
Bermudez was born in Boston, Massachusetts, United States Bermudez started training Brazilian jiu-jitsu at the age of thirteen and competed his first amateur fight five year later.

Mixed martial arts career

Early career
Bermudez fought all his fights under Cage Titan, Classic Entertainment, and Sports promotions since 2015 and amassed a record of 11-0 prior signed by UFC.

Ultimate Fighting Championship
Bermudez made his UFC debut on February 24, 2018, at UFC on Fox: Emmett vs. Stephens against Albert Morales. He won the fight by a guillotine choke in round two.

Bermudez was scheduled to face Davey Grant on 27 May 2018 at UFC Fight Night 130. However, Grant pulled out of the fight after being diagnosed with a staph infection, and the bout was scrapped. The pairing was left intact and took place on 22 July 2018 at UFC Fight Night 134. He won the fight via a triangle choke.

Bermudez was scheduled to face Benito Lopez on January 26, 2019 at UFC 233. As a result of the cancellation of UFC 233, the pair was rescheduled to UFC on ESPN: Ngannou vs. Velasquez on February 17, 2019.
At the weigh-ins, Bermudez weighed in at 140 pounds, 4 pounds over the bantamweight non-title fight upper limit of 136 pounds. As a result, the bout proceeded at catchweight and Bermudez was fined 30% of his purse which went to his opponent Lopez. He won the fight via a submission in round one.

After the Lopez fight, Bermudez signed a new, four-fight contract with the UFC.

A bantamweight bout between Bermudez and Casey Kenney  was originally scheduled to on August 17, 2019 at UFC 241. However, the UFC decided to move the bout to a catchweight bout of 140 lbs. due to the fighters cutting substantial weight the night before weigh-ins. Bermudez lost the bout via unanimous decision.

Bermudez faced Charles Rosa on October 18, 2019 at UFC on ESPN 6. At the weigh-in,  Bermudez weighed in at 148 pounds, 2 pounds over the featherweight non-title fight limit of 146. The bout was held at catchweight. Bermudez was fined 20% of his purse which went to Rosa. He lost the fight via a submission in round one, and was subsequently released from the promotion.

Post-UFC career
On January 20, 2020, news surfaced that Bermudez would face Bruce Boyington at New England Fights 42 on February 8, 2020, replacing Josh Grispi who was forced to withdraw from the bout due to legal complications. At the weigh-ins, Bermudez missed the lightweight title fight weight limit, making him ineligible for the championship. Bermudez won the fight via first-round submission.

Personal life
Bermudez is a student at Bridgewater State University, majoring in Business Management.

Mixed martial arts record 

|-
|Win
|align=center|15–2
|Bruce Boyington
|Submission (guillotine choke)
|New England Fights 42
|
|align=center|1
|align=center|1:54
|Portland, Maine, United States
| 
|-
|Loss
|align=center|14–2
|Charles Rosa
|Submission (armbar)
|UFC on ESPN: Reyes vs. Weidman 
|
|align=center|1
|align=center|2:46
|Boston, Massachusetts, United States
| 
|-
|Loss
|align=center|14–1
|Casey Kenney
|Decision (unanimous)
|UFC 241 
|
|align=center|3
|align=center|5:00
|Anaheim, California, United States
|
|-
|Win
|align=center|14–0
|Benito Lopez
|Submission (guillotine choke)
|UFC on ESPN: Ngannou vs. Velasquez
|
|align=center|1
|align=center|3:09
|Phoenix, Arizona, United States
|
|-
|Win
|align=center|13–0
|Davey Grant
|Technical Submission (triangle choke)
|UFC Fight Night: Shogun vs. Smith
|
|align=center|1
|align=center|0:59
|Hamburg, Germany
|
|-
|Win
|align=center|12–0
|Albert Morales
|Submission (guillotine choke)
|UFC on Fox: Emmett vs. Stephens
|
|align=center|2
|align=center|2:33
|Orlando, Florida, United States
|
|-
|Win
|align=center|11–0
|Seth Basler
|Submission (triangle choke)
|Cage Titans 37
|
|align=center|1
|align=center|1:06
|Plymouth, Massachusetts, United States
|
|-
|Win
|align=center|10–0
|Bendy Casimir
|Submission (triangle choke)
|Cage Titans 35
|
|align=center|1
|align=center|1:12
|Plymouth, Massachusetts, United States
|
|-
|Win
|align=center|9–0
|Tony Gravely
|Submission (armbar)
|Cage Titans 33
|
|align=center|1
|align=center|N/A
|Plymouth, Massachusetts, United States
|
|-
|Win
|align=center|8–0
|Saul Almeida
|Decision (split)
|CES MMA 39
|
|align=center|3
|align=center|5:00
|Plymouth, Massachusetts, United States
|
|-
|Win
|align=center|7–0
|Rodrigo Almeida
|Submission (guillotine choke)
|Cage Titans 30
|
|align=center|1
|align=center|0:54
|Plymouth, Massachusetts, United States
|
|-
|Win
|align=center|6–0
|Jeff Anderson
|Submission (guillotine choke)
|Cage Titans 29
|
|align=center|1
|align=center|1:06
|Plymouth, Massachusetts, United States
|
|-
|Win
|align=center|5–0
|Dan Dubuque
|Decision (unanimous)
|Cage Titans 27
|
|align=center|3
|align=center|5:00
|Plymouth, Massachusetts, United States
|
|-
|Win
|align=center|4–0
|Evan Parker
|Submission (rear-naked choke)
|CES MMA 32
|
|align=center|1
|align=center|1:43
|Lincoln, Rhode Island, United States
|
|-
|Win
|align=center|3–0
|Scott Gorgone
|Submission (triangle choke)
|Cage Titans 26
|
|align=center|1
|align=center|1:24
|Plymouth, Massachusetts, United States
|
|-
|Win
|align=center|2–0
|Mak Kelleher
|Submission (triangle choke)
|CES MMA 30
|
|align=center|1
|align=center|3:05
|Lincoln, Rhode Island, United States
|
|-
|Win
|align=center|1–0
|Manny Torres
|TKO (punches)
|Cage Titans 24
|
|align=center|1
|align=center|2:57
|Plymouth, Massachusetts, United States
|
|-

See also
 List of current UFC fighters
 List of male mixed martial artists

References

External links
 
 

1994 births
Living people
American male mixed martial artists
Featherweight mixed martial artists
Mixed martial artists utilizing Brazilian jiu-jitsu
American practitioners of Brazilian jiu-jitsu
Sportspeople from Boston
Mixed martial artists from Massachusetts
Ultimate Fighting Championship male fighters